Red Sky (translit. Kokkinos ouranos) is a 2011 Greek drama film directed by Laya Yourgou.

Cast
 Apostolis Totsikas
 Orfeas Avgoustidis
 Pihla Viitala
 Efstathia Tsapareli
 Laertis Vasiliou
 Altin Huta
 Angeliki Lemoni
 Argiris Thanasoulas
 Adonis Vlisidis

References

External links
 

2011 films
2011 drama films
Greek drama films
2010s Greek-language films